Valley Road may refer to:

Valley Pike, the traditional name for what is now US 11 through the Shenandoah Valley of Virginia

Valley of Fire Road, road in Clark County, Nevada
Valley Road Estate, public housing estate in Hong Kong
Valley Road (MBTA station), light rail stop in Milton, Massachusetts
The Valley Road, song recorded by Bruce Hornsby
Valley Road, a rural community located in New Brunswick
Valley Road, Santa Barbara, California, part of California State Route 192